Wílmer Jesus Azofeifa Valverde (born 4 June 1994) is a Costa Rican professional footballer who plays as a midfielder. He was born in Pococí and currently plays for Liga FPD club San Carlos.

International career
Azofeifa was called up by coach Oscar Ramirez for friendly matches in March 2018 against Scotland and Tunisia in preparation for the 2018 FIFA World Cup. He made his senior debut for the Costa Rica  national football team on March 23, 2018 in a friendly match in Glasgow against Scotland.

Honours
Individual
 CONCACAF League Team of the Tournament: 2017

References

Living people
1994 births
Costa Rican footballers
Costa Rican expatriate footballers
Costa Rica international footballers
Association football midfielders
Santos de Guápiles footballers
Sarpsborg 08 FF players
Aalesunds FK players
Liga FPD players
Eliteserien players
Norwegian First Division players
People from Limón Province
Costa Rican expatriate sportspeople in Mexico
Costa Rican expatriate sportspeople in Norway
Expatriate footballers in Mexico
Expatriate footballers in Norway